Bikah may refer to:
 Bikah, Iran
 Bikah District
 Bikah Rural District